Les Chemins de verre is the fourth studio album by Canadian indie rock group Karkwa. The album's title literally translates as "The Glass Pathways" or "The Glass Roads", although it is also a pun on the French language phrase chemins de fer, or "railroads".

The entire album was written and recorded over the span of 21 days.

The album won the 2010 Polaris Music Prize, making Karkwa the first francophone band to win the award. The album subsequently also won the Juno Award for Francophone Album of the Year at the 2011 Juno Awards.

The album has received a gold certification by Music Canada, selling 40,000 copies as of December 8, 2011.

Track listing

References 

2010 albums
Karkwa albums
Polaris Music Prize-winning albums
Juno Award for Francophone Album of the Year albums